Destiny (French: Destin) is a 1927 French silent film directed by Dimitri Kirsanoff and starring Nadia Sibirskaïa, Guy Belmont and Christenson.

Cast
 Nadia Sibirskaïa as Liliane  
 Guy Belmont as André Verlin  
 Christenson as Le père de Liliane  
 A. Stesenko as La fiancée d'André  
 Georgette Mussey 
 Georges Roland

References

Bibliography 
 Dayna Oscherwitz & MaryEllen Higgins. The A to Z of French Cinema. Scarecrow Press, 2009.

External links 
 

1927 films
French silent films
1920s French-language films
Films directed by Dimitri Kirsanoff
French black-and-white films
1920s French films